Cyclophora inaequalis is a moth in the  family Geometridae. It is found in Zambia.

References

Endemic fauna of Zambia
Moths described in 1902
Cyclophora (moth)
Fauna of Zambia
Moths of Africa